Bencomia is a genus of four rare plant species native to the Canary Islands, which grow as woody, branching shrubs with glossy, evergreen leaves and central, pendulous inflorescences with small flowers followed by densely packed, globular fruits. Mature heights range from 1 to 4 meters.

Species
 Bencomia brachystachya
 Bencomia caudata
 Bencomia exstipulata
 Bencomia sphaerocarpa

External links
UniProt entry
Plant Systematics (photos)
RarePlants entry

Sanguisorbinae
Rosaceae genera